is a Japanese voice actor.

Notable voice roles

Voice roles

Television animation
Anime Ganbare Goemon (Mr. Protein)
Cardcaptor Sakura (Yoshiyuki Terada (first season))
Fushigi Yūgi (Nakago)
Kurau Phantom Memory (Inspector Wong)
Initial D (Natsuki Mogi's "papa")
Magical Project S (Andou Toyokawa)
Trigun (Millions Knives)
Bleach (Zabimaru & Koga Gau)
Super Robot Wars Original Generation: Divine Wars (Ingram Prisken)
Flame of Recca (Noroi)
Kamichu! (Tyler)
Lucky Star (Tadao Hiiragi)
Cyborg Kuro-chan (Dr. Go)
Brave Police J-Decker (Deckerd/J-Decker/Fire J-Decker)
Naruto (Yurinojō)
Naruto Shippuden (Fukai) (episode 282 and 283)
Naruto the Movie: Ninja Clash in the Land of Snow (Michy)
Baccano! (Nicholas Wayne)
The Book of Bantorra (Fotona)
Ef: A Tale of Memories (Akira Amamiya)
Rainbow: Nisha Rokubō no Shichinin (Kawamata)
Toradora! (Rikuro Aisaka)
Chrome Shelled Regios (Derk Saiharden)
Phantom ~Requiem for the Phantom~ (Roshenko)
Shuffle! (Mikio Fuyo)
Hell Girl: Two Mirrors (Toshiya Kakinuma)
Bokurano: Ours (Akira Tokosumi)

Original video animation
Hunter × Hunter: G.I. Final (Razor)

Drama CD
Abunai series 2: Abunai Summer Vacation
Abunai series 4: Abunai Campus Love (Yoshitaka Izumi)
Kiken ga Ippai (Kondou)
Mizuki-sensei Ki wo Tsukete (Yukimasa Haneda)
Otawamure wo Prince (Kouki Matsuo)
Shiritsu Takizawa Koukou Seitokai (Satoshi Oozawa)
Suit and Ribbon Tie (Ryuuichi Kijima)
Weiss Kreuz (Ayame)

Theatrical animation
Cardcaptor Sakura (Yoshiyuki Terada)
X/1999 (Seishirō Sakurazuka)
Perfect Blue (Yatazaki)

Dubbing

Live-action
8mm 2 (David Huxley (Johnathon Schaech))
24 (Wayne Palmer (D. B. Woodside))
2012: Supernova (Kelvin (Brian Krause))
Aliens (Carter Burke (Paul Reiser))
Anna Magdalena (Editor (Leslie Cheung))
August Rush (Counselor Richard Jeffries (Terrence Howard))
Bad Day (Harry McCann)
The Basketball Diaries (Mickey (Mark Wahlberg))
Basquiat (Jean-Michel Basquiat (Jeffrey Wright))
The Bourne Supremacy (Tom Cronin (Tom Gallop))
Brassed Off (Andy Barrow (Ewan McGregor))
The Brave One (Detective Sean Mercer (Terrence Howard))
Broken Arrow (Kelly (Howie Long))
Carrington (Gerald Brenan (Samuel West))
Deadly Heroes (Brad Cartowski (Michael Paré))
Enemy of the State (Robert Clayton Dean (Will Smith))
Extreme Ops (Jeffrey (Rupert Graves))
The Fabulous Baker Boys (Lloyd (Xander Berkeley))
Feast of Love (David Watson (Billy Burke))
Fire Down Below (Earl Kellogg (Stephen Lang))
Fringe (John Scott (Mark Valley))
The Hunting Party (Duck (Terrence Howard))
I Still Know What You Did Last Summer (Tyrell Martin (Mekhi Phifer))
Iceman: The Time Traveller (Cheung (Simon Yam))
Independence Day (Captain Jimmy Wilder (Harry Connick Jr.))
Intensity (Jack Templeton (Kavan Smith))
The Island of Dr. Moreau (Dr. Montgomery (Val Kilmer))
Joshua (Ned Davidoff (Dallas Roberts))
Journey to the Center of the Earth (2010 TV Asahi edition) (Max Anderson (Jean-Michel Paré))
Killing Me Softly (Jake (Jason Hughes))
Kit Kittredge: An American Girl (Jack Kittredge (Chris O'Donnell))
Lara Croft: Tomb Raider – The Cradle of Life (Chen Lo (Simon Yam))
Lethal Weapon 4 (Wah Sing Ku (Jet Li))
Loch Ness Terror (James Murphy (Brian Krause))
The Man Who Knew Too Little (Dimitri (John Thomson))
Mindhunters (Gabe Jensen (LL Cool J))
The Mist (Brent Norton (Andre Braugher))
Newcastle (Victor Hoff (Reshad Strik))
Nightwatch (Martin Bells (Ewan McGregor))
Perfect Stranger (Cameron (Gary Dourdan))
Platoon (1998 DVD edition) (Rhah (Francesco Quinn), Tex)
Platoon (2003 TV Tokyo edition) (Ace)
Rambo (Michael Burnett (Paul Schulze))
Recoil (Detective Ray Morgan (Gary Daniels))
Redbelt (Mike Terry (Chiwetel Ejiofor))
Scream 2 (Phil Stevens (Omar Epps))
Shoot 'Em Up (Mr. Smith (Clive Owen))
Sliding Doors (James Hammerton (John Hannah))
Speed Racer (Mr. Musha (Hiroyuki Sanada))
SPL II: A Time for Consequences (Chan Kwok-wah (Simon Yam))
Starship Troopers (Pvt. Ace Levy (Jake Busey))
Stormbreaker (Yassen Gregorovich (Damian Lewis))
Taegukgi (North Korean Commander (Choi Min-sik))
Terminator 3: Rise of the Machines (Scott Mason (Mark Famiglietti))
VR Troopers (Ryan Steele (Brad Hawkins))
Wuthering Heights (Heathcliff (Laurence Olivier))

Animation
Pocahontas (John Smith)
Sleeping Beauty (Prince Phillip)
Gulliver's Travels (Gulliver)

Game
Natsuki Crisis Battle (Endo)
Guilty Gear 2: Overture (Izuna)
Infinite Undiscovery (Eugene)
Super Robot Wars series (Ingram Prisken)
Kingdom Hearts Birth By Sleep (Prince Phillip)
Mega Man Zero 4 (Tech Kraken)

References

External links
 Tooru Furusawa at Kenyu-Office
 

1962 births
Living people
People from Maebashi
Japanese male video game actors
Japanese male voice actors
20th-century Japanese male actors
21st-century Japanese male actors

pt:Anexo:Lista de seiyū#F